The Mongolian Bankers Association (MBA) is an independent, non-profit and non-government organization under which the banking and nonbanking financial institutions officially licensed to operate within the territory of Mongolia are unified.

The Mongolian Bankers Association is a self-regulated professional association that was established in 2000. With over 20 members, the association integrates all 14 commercial banks, a development bank, 5 financial and non-financial banking institutions, and 3 foreign bank representative offices. These members all aim to lead the banking and financial sector in support of the sustainable development and equitable economic growth of Mongolia.

Considerable efforts were made to amplify the cooperation with other international bankers associations, namely with ARB, CBA, and JBA, and to become affiliated with the Asian Bankers Association and International Financial Institution.

Furthermore, to facilitate and leverage the financial development of Mongolia, it has initiated and established the Banking and Finance Academy, the Credit Information Bureau, the Credit Guarantee Fund, and the Mongolian Mortgage Corporation in cooperation with its members. Weekly newsletters have been published since the first quarter of 2007 to provide a network for members to exchange views and offer opportunities for effective communication, to deliver news to their customers and legal entities, and to efficiently promote the operation of the association.

Currently the MBA Weekly Newsletter is delivered online to its subscribers, through their website, and through other social media channels.

To amplify the status as a professional association for banking and financial professionals, the risk management, legal, human resource, special asset management and marketing expert consultants’ councils were set up by the secretariat of the association.

The professional councils have enabled banking and financial officers to effectively share their knowledge and experience in their fields of interest, determine and foresee the challenges and urgent issues in the sector, and seek for solutions. The MBA secretariat, chaired by the chief executive officer, coordinates the daily operation of the association in conformity with the resolutions, decisions, and directions by the board of directors.

References

Bankers associations
Professional associations based in Mongolia
Central Asia articles needing attention